"Thank You Girl" is a song recorded by the Beatles, written by John Lennon and Paul McCartney.

Thank You Girl may also refer to:

"Thank You Girl", a song by John Hiatt from his 1987 album Bring the Family
"Thank You Girl", 1970 single by Rupert Holmes
"Thank You Girl", 1973 single by Jimmy Ruffin